The history of ambassadors of the United States to Zambia began in 1964.

Until 1964 Zambia had been a colony of the British Empire, first as Northern Rhodesia and then as a part of the Federation of Rhodesia and Nyasaland. On December 31, 1963, the federation was dissolved into Rhodesia and Northern Rhodesia. On October 24, 1964, Northern Rhodesia gained full independence as the Republic of Zambia.

The United States immediately recognized the new nation and moved to establish diplomatic relations. An embassy in Lusaka was established on October 24, 1964—independence day for Zambia.  Robert C. Foulon was appointed as Chargé d’Affaires ad interim pending the appointment of an ambassador. The first ambassador, Robert C. Good was appointed on March 11, 1965. All U.S. Ambassadors to Zambia have held the official title Ambassador Extraordinary and Plenipotentiary.

The United States embassy in Zambia is located in Lusaka.

The U.S. ambassador to Zambia serves concurrently as the U.S. representative to the Common Market for Eastern and Southern Africa (COMESA).

Ambassadors

Notes

See also
United States - Zambia relations
Foreign relations of Zambia
Ambassadors of the United States

References
United States Department of State: Background notes on Zambia

External links
 United States Department of State: Chiefs of Mission for Zambia
 United States Department of State: Zambia
 United States Embassy in Lusaka

Zambia
 
United States
1964 establishments in Zambia